Learning to Breathe is the third studio album by the band Switchfoot. It was released on September 26, 2000. It was their final record for independent label re:think Records, which was distributed by Sparrow Records. This album also received a Grammy nomination for Best Rock Gospel Album in 2001.

Promotion
A music video was filmed for the song "You Already Take Me There". It shows the band skydiving out of an airplane, and playing the song on the ground.

Composition
"Dare You To Move", "Playing For Keeps", "The Loser", "Erosion" and "Living Is Simple" are in the key of E major or C# minor.

"Learning to Breathe" and "You Already Take Me There" are in the key of G Major.

"Love is the Movement" and "Innocence Again" are in the key of D minor.

"Poparazzi" is in the key of C major. "The Economy of Mercy" is written in the key of D major.

References
"All will be made well" by Julian of Norwich is heard in "Living is Simple". Marilyn Monroe, MTV, Nirvana, and other popular media are referenced in "Poparazzi".

Legacy
The songs "I Dare You to Move" and "Learning to Breathe" were prominently used in a popular teen romantic drama film starring Mandy Moore and Shane West, A Walk to Remember (2002).

The phrase "Love Is the Movement" has been adopted as a motto by To Write Love on Her Arms, a non-profit organization that Switchfoot supports.

Track listing

Personnel

Switchfoot
Jon Foreman – lead vocals, guitar, keyboards
Tim Foreman – bass, backing vocals, keyboards
Chad Butler – drums, percussion

Additional musicians
Vicky Hampton – additional backing vocals (track 4)
Darwin Hobbs – additional backing vocals (track 4)
Jan Foreman – additional vocals (track 11)

Technical personnel
Charlie Peacock – production (tracks 1–2, 4–5 and 9)
Jacquire King – production (tracks 3, 6–8, 10), recording (tracks 3, 6–8, 10), mixing (tracks 2–3, 5–10)
Switchfoot – production (track 11)
Shane D. Wilson – recording (tracks 1–2, 4–5, 9 and 11), overdubs recording (tracks 1–2, 4–5 and 9), mixing (track 11)
Richie Biggs – overdubs recording (tracks 1–2, 4–5 and 9)
Jon Foreman – pre-production recordings (tracks 1–2, 4–5, 9 and 11)
Ryan Fisher – pre-production recordings (tracks 1–2, 4–5 and 9), engineering assistance (tracks 1–2, 4–5 and 9), mixing (tracks 1 and 4)

Tony Miracle – pre-production recordings (tracks 1–2, 4–5, 9 and 11), synths and noise (tracks 1–2, 4–5 and 9), analog synths and textures (tracks 3, 6–8, 10)
Kip Kuban – pre-production recordings (tracks 1–2, 4–5 and 9), synths and noise (tracks 1–2, 4–5 and 9)
Dan Leffler – mixing assistance (tracks 2–3, 5–10)
Chris Grainger – assistance (tracks 3, 6–8, 10)
Chris Hauser – assistance (tracks 3, 6–8, 10)
Lynn A. Nichols – executive production
Ken Love – mastering

References

External links
Lyrics for Learning to Breathe

2000 albums
Albums produced by Charlie Peacock
Albums produced by Jacquire King
Albums produced by Switchfoot
Switchfoot albums